This is  demography of the population of Montserrat including population density, ethnicity, education level, health of the populace, economic status, religious affiliations and other aspects of the population.

Population
Montserrat Had a population of 7,119 in 1842.

In 1995, the Soufriere Hills Volcano eruption caused two-thirds of the population of about 11,500 people to evacuate the island. According to the 2001 census only 4,491 people were resident of Montserrat. The total local-born population was 69% while those born abroad were 31%.
The estimated mid-year population of 2014 is 5,100 (medium fertility scenario of The 2012 Revision of the World Population Prospects).
note:
Approximately two thirds of the population left the island following the resumption of volcanic activity in July 1995. According to the 2001 UK Census 7,983 Montserratian-born people were residing in the UK (almost twice the population of Montserrat itself).

Vital statistics

Structure of the population
Structure of the population (12 May 2011) (Census) :

Ethnic groups

The vast majority of the population of Montserrat are of African descent (92.4% at the 2001 census) or mixed (2.9%). There is also a European origin minority (3.0%; mostly descendants of Irish indentured servants or British colonists), East Indians (1.0%) groups.
Out of 403 Amerindians at the 1980 census only 3 persons were left in 2001.

Religion

See also
Montserrat 
Montserratian British

References

 
Society of Montserrat
Geography of Montserrat